Rodney Walker (1910–1986) was a midcentury American modern designer and builder who specialized in residential architecture in the Southern California area. He contributed three designs to Arts & Architecture magazine's Case Study House program during the late 1940s (Case Study House #16, #17, and #18). Many of his homes were photographed by Julius Shulman for Arts & Architecture magazine, Better Homes and Gardens, Architectural Record, Sunset, and the Los Angeles Times Home magazine.

Life and career
Rodney Walker was born in Ely, Nevada, on September 15, 1910. He attended Pasadena City College before transferring to University of California Los Angeles where he graduated with a degree in art. In 1937, Rodney and his wife Dorothea built their first house in West Los Angeles. Soon after, he went to work for Rudolph M. Schindler as a draftsman.

Over the next thirty years, Walker designed and built some 100 homes in Southern California. He designed numerous "case-study" homes, exploring the adaptability of new ideas in small houses. He was known for his ability to hold down construction costs.

From 1958, Walker lived in the 4,300 square foot hilltop home in Ojai, California, that he had designed and built, and which he considered his masterpiece. After he discontinued home designing and contracting, he ran the Oaks hotel in Ojai for 15 years and operated a store in which he sold jewelry that he crafted. Walker died on June 18, 1986 at his home in Ojai. He was survived by his wife, Dorothea; sons, Bruce, Mark and Craig, as well as twin daughters, Ellen Langston and Lisa Kaufman.

Legacy
The Walker Residence went up for sale in September 2011 asking $3.995 million.

Between 2012 and 2014, actor Zac Efron lived in a Walker house in Hollywood Hills West which was originally designed for the Case Study Program; the home and was eventually built in 1947. The house was sold for $2.775 million in 2014.

References 

1910 births
1986 deaths
Pasadena City College alumni
UCLA School of the Arts and Architecture alumni
20th-century American architects
People from Ely, Nevada